WITI may refer to:

Witi, a location in Ethiopia
Witi (born 1996), Mozambican professional footballer
Witi Ihimaera (born 1944), New Zealand author
Witi language, alternative spelling for Wiri, an Aboriginal Australian language of Queensland
WITI (TV), a television station (channel 31, virtual 6) licensed to Milwaukee, Wisconsin, United States
WITI TV Tower
 (Military Institute of Engineering Equipment), Poland
Women in Technology International